Berek is a municipality in Bjelovar-Bilogora County, Croatia. There are 1,443 inhabitants, of which 90% are Croats.

History
In the late 19th and early 20th century, Berek was part of the Bjelovar-Križevci County of the Kingdom of Croatia-Slavonia.

References

Municipalities of Croatia
Populated places in Bjelovar-Bilogora County